Butter burgers are hamburgers topped with butter, either directly on the patty, or on the bun. Likely invented in Wisconsin, they remain popular throughout the midwestern United States, and are the principal item of Wisconsin-based fast food restaurant Culver's. Many restaurants in and around Wisconsin serve butter burgers.

History 
In 1885, Charlie Nagreen served hamburgers fried in butter, at the Seymour fair, inventing the butter burger in the process. The butter burger was popularized by Solly's Grille and Krolls' in 1936. Both restaurants placed a pat of butter on top of the patty while it was cooking. Culver's, which was founded in 1984, butters the top bun, as opposed to the patty itself. In 2009, Steak 'n Shake introduced their "Wisconsin Buttery Steakburger", including Wisconsin butter and American cheese.  In 2015, Jack in the Box introduced the “Classic Buttery Jack”, a butter burger with garlic herb butter melted onto the patty.

See also 

 List of hamburgers

References 

Hamburgers (food)
Cuisine of Wisconsin
Cuisine of the Midwestern United States
Wisconsin culture
Culver's